Patrick Henry Winston (February 5, 1943 – July 19, 2019) was an American computer scientist and professor at the Massachusetts Institute of Technology. Winston was director of the MIT Artificial Intelligence Laboratory from 1972 to 1997, succeeding Marvin Minsky, who left to help found the MIT Media Lab. Winston was succeeded as director by Rodney Brooks.

After graduating high school, Winston left East Peoria, a suburb of Peoria, IL, to come to MIT by train. He received his undergraduate degree from MIT in 1965, where he was a member of Phi Delta Theta fraternity, and went on to complete his Masters and PhD there as well, finalizing his PhD in 1970. His research interests included machine learning and human intelligence. Winston was known within the MIT community for his excellent teaching and strong commitment to supporting MIT undergraduate culture.

At MIT, Winston taught 6.034: Artificial Intelligence and 6.803/6.833: Human Intelligence Enterprise. Winston's How to Speak talk was an MIT tradition for over 40 years. "Offered every January, the talk is intended to improve your speaking ability in critical situations by teaching you a few heuristic rules." A book with his insights and teachings on communication was published in 2020 by the MIT Press: "Make It Clear: Speak and Write to Persuade and Inform".

Winston served as president of the Association for the Advancement of Artificial Intelligence from 1985–1987.

Winston died in Boston on July 19, 2019.

Bibliography and publications 
Winston authored a number of computer science and AI textbooks, including:
 Artificial Intelligence 
 The Psychology of Computer Vision 
 Lisp (with Berthold K.P. Horn) 
 On to C 
 On to C++ 
 On to Java (with Sundar Narasimhan) 
 On to Smalltalk

References

External links
 Personal homepage
 

 Oral History with Patrick H. Winston, Charles Babbage Institute, University of Minnesota, Minneapolis.

1943 births
2019 deaths
Scientists from Illinois
Writers from Peoria, Illinois
Artificial intelligence researchers
American cognitive scientists
Massachusetts Institute of Technology faculty
MIT School of Engineering alumni
Fellows of the Association for the Advancement of Artificial Intelligence
American computer scientists
Lisp (programming language) people
Presidents of the Association for the Advancement of Artificial Intelligence